Midori Iwama (born April 16, 1994), known professionally as Midori Francis, is an American actress. She began her career in theatre, earning NYIT, Obie, and Drama Desk Awards. She received a Daytime Emmy nomination for her role as Lily in the Netflix series Dash & Lily (2020).

Early life and education
Francis grew up in Rumson, New Jersey. She is the daughter of Joanne and Ken Iwama, the current chancellor of Indiana University Northwest. Named after her paternal grandmother, Francis is of Japanese descent on her father's side and Irish and Italian on her mother's. On growing up in a predominantly white town in the 90s and early 2000s, she commented "I was teased a lot for being Asian, I was bullied, made to feel like I was ugly or weird". She identifies as Hapa (a term for people of mixed European and Asian or Pacific Islander ancestry).

Francis attended Rumson-Fair Haven Regional High School, graduating in 2009. She went on to obtain a Bachelor of Fine Arts in acting from the Mason Gross School of the Arts at Rutgers University in 2014. She studied abroad in London, training with Tim Carroll and performing The Two Gentlemen of Verona at Shakespeare's Globe.

Career
Upon graduating from Rutgers, Francis landed stage roles in regional productions of Vanya and Sonia and Masha and Spike and Peter and the Starcatcher as Nina and Molly respectively. She won Best Actress at the 2016 New York Innovative Theatre Awards as well as receiving a Best Ensemble nomination for her role as Meghan in the Off-Broadway play Connected at 59E59 Theaters. From 2017 to 2018, she was in the original cast of The Wolves, garnering ensemble awards at the Obie and Drama Desk Awards. At the latter, Francis was also nominated for Outstanding Actress in Play for her role in Ming Peiffer's Usual Girls.

In 2018, Francis made her feature film debut in Ocean's 8. The following year, she appeared in South Mountain and Good Boys. In October 2019, it was announced Francis would star in her first lead role opposite Austin Abrams in the 2020 Netflix Christmas romantic comedy series Dash & Lily, an adaptation of the young adult novel by David Levithan and Rachel Cohn. Francis was included in the creative process, as elements from her real life background and experiences were incorporated. For her performance, Francis was nominated for Lead Actress in a Daytime Fiction Program at the 2021 Daytime Emmy Awards.

Francis appeared alongside Victoria Justice in the Netflix fantasy comedy film Afterlife of the Party in 2021. 

In March 2021, it was announced Francis had joined the main cast of the HBO Max series The Sex Lives of College Girls, which premiered later that year. 

In January 2022, Francis was set to star in the TV thriller film Unseen with Jolene Purdy, helmed by Yoko Okumura in her feature directing debut.

Personal life 
Francis identifies as queer. She is vocal about Asian representation in media and speaks frequently about her experience as an Asian-American in Hollywood.

Filmography

Film

Television

Stage

Awards and nominations

References

External links

Living people
1994 births
21st-century American actresses
Actresses from New Jersey
American actresses of Japanese descent
American film actors of Asian descent
American film actresses
American people of Irish descent
American people of Italian descent
American stage actresses
American LGBT actors
American LGBT people of Asian descent
LGBT people from New Jersey
Mason Gross School of the Arts alumni
People from Rumson, New Jersey
American queer actresses
Queer women
Rumson-Fair Haven Regional High School alumni
Rutgers University alumni